The 1944 Ohio gubernatorial election was held on November 7, 1944. Democratic nominee Frank Lausche defeated Republican nominee James Garfield Stewart with 51.82% of the vote.

Primary elections
Primary elections were held on May 9, 1944.

Democratic primary

Candidates
Frank Lausche, Mayor of Cleveland
Martin L. Sweeney, former U.S. Representative
James W. Huffman, former Chairman of the Ohio Public Utilities Commission
Frazier Reams, Toledo Collector of Internal Revenue
Frank A. Dye
Walter Baertschi

Results

Republican primary

Candidates
James Garfield Stewart, Mayor of Cincinnati
Thomas J. Herbert, Ohio Attorney General
Paul M. Herbert, incumbent Lieutenant Governor
Albert Edward Payne

Results

General election

Candidates
Frank Lausche, Democratic
James Garfield Stewart, Republican

Results

References

1944
Ohio
Gubernatorial
November 1944 events